DTY or dty can refer to:

 the ISO 639-3 code for the Doteli language
 a kind of Polyester#Polyester_processing